The Guaráyu or Guaráyo languages (also known as Tupi–Guarani II) the  are a subgroup of the Tupi–Guarani language family.

Languages
The Guarayu languages are:

Guarayu
Pauserna (Warázu)
Sirionó (dialects: Yuqui, Jorá)

Rodrigues (2013) 
Languages listed by Rodrigues (2013):

Guarayo (Guarayú)
Sirionó
Horá (Jorá)

Rodrigues & Cabral (2012) 
Languages listed by Rodrigues and Cabral (2012):

Guaráyo (Guarayo, Guarayú)
Sirionó
Yúki

Dietrich (2010) 
Languages listed by Dietrich (2010):

 Guarayo
 Guarasug’wä/Pauserna
 Sirionó
 Yuki / Mbyá-Jê
 Aché/Guayaki

References

Tupi–Guarani languages